Evamaria Bath (born 1929) is a retired German stage, film, and television actress.

Selected filmography
 The Call of the Sea (1951)
 Natürlich die Nelli (1959)
 The Red Snowball Tree (1974, East German dub)

References

Bibliography
 Peter Cowie & Derek Elley. World Filmography: 1967. Fairleigh Dickinson University Press, 1977.

External links

1929 births
Living people
German film actresses
German television actresses
German stage actresses
Actresses from Berlin